Thotti Gang is a 2002 Telugu-language comedy film produced and directed by E. V. V. Satyanarayana starring Allari Naresh, Prabhu Deva,  Sunil, Gajala and Anita Hassanandani. The movie was released on 6 December 2002 to positive reviews and was declared a super hit at the box office. The film was based on 2001 American film Saving Silverman.

The film was dubbed and released in Tamil as Love Game with a separate comedy track featuring Livingston and Vennira Aadai Moorthy.

Cast

 Allari Naresh as Achi Babu
 Prabhu Deva as Suri Babu
 Sunil as Sathi Babu
 Anita Hassanandani as Venkata Lakshmi
 Gajala as Karate Malliswari
 Shakeela as Matasri
 L.B. Sriram as Alexander
 M. S. Narayana and Chalapathi Rao as Bongu Brothers
 Jaya Prakash Reddy in a Special Appearance
 Brahmanandam as Galigottam Govinda Sastry and also as his mother(dual role)
 Chittajalu Lakshmipati as Guravaiah
 Jyoti as Moogambika
 Rajitha

Soundtrack
Soundtrack was composed by Devi Sri Prasad.

References

External links
 

2002 films
2000s Telugu-language films
2002 romantic comedy films
Films set in Hyderabad, India
Films shot in Hyderabad, India
Indian romantic comedy films
Indian buddy comedy films
2000s buddy comedy films
Films directed by E. V. V. Satyanarayana
Films scored by Devi Sri Prasad
Indian remakes of American films